No. 242 Squadron RAF was a Royal Air Force (RAF) squadron. It flew in many roles during the First World War, Second World War and Cold War.

During the Second World War, the squadron was notable for (firstly) having many pilots who were either RCAF personnel  or Canadians serving in the RAF – to the extent that it was sometimes  known, unofficially, as "242 Canadian Squadron" – and (secondly) for being the first squadron to be commanded by Douglas Bader.

History

In World War I
No. 242 Squadron was formed on 15 August 1918 from the numbers 408, 409 and 514 Seaplane Flights at Newhaven Seaplane Base, and continued using the Short 184 from there and the nearby airfield at Telscombe Cliffs on anti-submarine patrols over the English Channel until the end of the First World War.

In World War II
The squadron was reformed at RAF Church Fenton on 30 October 1939 with Canadian personnel. At first using the Bristol Blenheim and Fairey Battle, it converted to the Hawker Hurricane in February 1940.

Battle for France

In May 1940 the squadron moved to RAF Coltishall Douglas Bader was posted to command the Squadron, as a Squadron Leader, at the end of June 1940, when the unit was mainly made up of Canadian pilots that had suffered high losses in the Battle of France and had low morale. Despite initial resistance to their new commanding officer, the pilots (including such aces as Willie McKnight) were soon won over by Bader's strong personality and perseverance, especially in cutting through red tape to make the squadron operational again. Upon the formation of No. 12 Group RAF, No. 242 Squadron was assigned to the Group while based at RAF Duxford.

Battle of Britain
In June 1940 it moved to RAF Coltishall in eastern England, as part of No. 12 Group RAF and was involved in the Battle of Britain. During this period 242 Squadron moved to RAF Duxford as part of the Duxford Wing, 12 Group's Big Wing formation. In 1941 it started offensive sweeps and bomber escorts and convoy patrols.

Dispersed at Java
In December 1941 the squadron moved to the far East arriving at RAF Seletar on 13 January 1942. The situation was desperate and it had to move to Palembang on Sumatra where the squadron collapsed through lack of spares and was dispersed by 10 March 1942. On 29 December 1941 Pilot Officer M. C. Blanchard (RCAF) was reported missing believed killed after a mid-air collision off the coast of Ghar Hassan, Malta, during an operational flight. The collision was between Hurricane BE343 (Blanchard) and Hurricane BE344 (Flight Lieutenant Andrews (RCAF) who was later found safe).

Reformed on Spitfires
On 10 April 1942 the squadron re-formed at RAF Turnhouse, Scotland with the Supermarine Spitfire and was involved in coastal patrols. In October it was deployed to North Africa defending Algiers. It fought into Tunisia then moved on to Malta and was involved in the invasion of Sicily and the Salerno beach-head operations. In 1944 it was moved to Syria for a rest period before moving to Corsica where it was part of the invasion of southern France and attacks on northern Italy. The squadron was disbanded in Italy on 4 November 1944.

In Transport Command
The squadron reformed again on 15 November 1944 at RAF Stoney Cross as a transport squadron, training on the Vickers Wellington then getting operational on the Short Stirling. By 1946 it had become an operator of the Avro York running scheduled freight services into India and to the Azores; in June 1946 it was located at RAF Oakington as part of No. 47 Group. In 1948 it became involved in the Berlin Air Lift operating from Wunstorf. After the air lift it returned to England and reequipped with Handley Page Hastings. The squadron was disbanded at RAF Lyneham on 1 May 1950.

On missiles
On 1 October 1959 it was reformed at RAF Marham as a surface-to-air missile unit with the Bristol Bloodhound. It was tasked to protect the V bomber bases until disbanded on 30 September 1964.

Aircraft operated

References

Notes

Bibliography

 Brickhill, Paul. Reach for the Sky. London: Collins, 1954.(Bader biography)
 Halley, James J. The Squadrons of the Royal Air Force & Commonwealth, 1918–1988. Tonbridge, Kent, UK: Air-Britain (Historians) Ltd., 1988. .
 Halliday, Hugh. 242 Squadron: The Canadian Years – Being the Story of the RAF's 'All-Canadian' Fighter Squadron. Stittsville, Ontario, Canada: Canada's Wings, Inc., 1981. .
 Jefford, C.G. RAF Squadrons, a Comprehensive Record of the Movement and Equipment of all RAF Squadrons and their Antecedents since 1912. Shrewsbury, Shropshire, UK: Airlife Publishing, 1998 (second edition 2001). .
 Moyes, Philip J.R. Bomber Squadrons of the RAF and their Aircraft. London: Macdonald and Jane's (Publishers) Ltd., 1964 (new edition 1976). .
 Rawlings, John D.R. Coastal, Support and Special Squadrons of the RAF and their Aircraft. London: Jane's Publishing Company Ltd., 1982. .
 Rawlings, John D.R. Fighter Squadrons of the RAF and their Aircraft. London: Macdonald and Jane's (Publishers) Ltd., 1969 (new edition 1976, reprinted 1978). .
 Robinson, Anthony. RAF Fighter Squadrons in the Battle of Britain. London: Arms and Armour Press Ltd., 1987 (republished 1999 by Brockhampton Press).
 David E. Fisher, A Race On The Edge Of Time. New York, Athena Books 1989 .

External links

 No. 242's actions between 10/05/1940 and 30/06/1940 on epibreren.com
 World War II bases of No. 242 Squadron
 History of No.'s 241–245 Squadrons at RAF Web
 No. 242 Squadron and the Battle of Britain
 Travels with a Spitfire or No. 242 (Fighter) Squadron - 1942 to 1944 
 No. 242 Squadron, 25 May 1944

Military units and formations established in 1918
242 Squadron
Aircraft squadrons of the Royal Air Force in World War II
1918 establishments in the United Kingdom
Military units and formations in Mandatory Palestine in World War II
Military units and formations disestablished in 1964